Aaron Denton Webster (born 19 December 1980) is an English former professional footballer who spent the majority of his career with Burton Albion.

Playing career
Webster was part of the Burton Albion, his first team, after progressing from the youth team in 1998. He became one of the most capped players in the club's history, making 591 appearances in all competitions and scoring 101 goals during his 15 years at the club. After leaving The Brewers, he played for both Ilkeston and Mickleover Sports briefly before joining Basford United in 2014. On 10 October 2018 he joined Stapenhill FC as a player for a brief spell.

Coaching career
After retiring he worked at the Burton Albion Community Trust as football and education first-team manager. In December 2017 he was appointed manager of Belper Town. However, he was sacked by the club in April 2018 after the club won only five times in 25 matches.

Career statistics

Personal life
In 2014, with a potential end to his career in sight, Webster planned to open a new sports bar in Burton on Trent. He said: "Football doesn't last forever, so it's a business venture I'm interested in pursuing. We were looking at a few different venues but this is the one I'd had an eye on for a while."
Webster has now returned to Burton Albion in a coaching role with the club's youth teams.

Honours
Conference National: 2008–09
Northern Premier League: 2001–02

References

External links

1980 births
Living people
Footballers from Derby
English footballers
Association football defenders
Association football midfielders
Burton Albion F.C. players
Ilkeston F.C. players
Mickleover Sports F.C. players
Basford United F.C. players
Southern Football League players
Northern Premier League players
National League (English football) players
English Football League players
Burton Albion F.C. non-playing staff
Belper Town F.C. managers
English football managers